Yuqing Gao is a Computer Scientist noted for her research on
middleware and speech-to-speech translation.

Biography

Gao received a 
Ph.D in Electrical Engineering from 
Southeast University in
Jiangsu, China in 1989.

She worked at Apple Computer from 1993-1995. She had a long career at IBM
as a manager and researcher from 1995-2014, and was an IBM Distinguished
Engineer in 2013.  Between 2015 and 2020, she was with Microsoft. As of 2020, she is with Amazon.

Awards

Her notable awards include:
 IEEE Fellow (2009) 
 2009 ABIE Award Winner

References

Year of birth missing (living people)
Living people
Chinese computer scientists
Chinese women computer scientists
Southeast University alumni
IBM people
Microsoft people
Amazon (company) people
Fellow Members of the IEEE
20th-century Chinese scientists
20th-century Chinese women scientists
21st-century Chinese scientists
21st-century Chinese women scientists
Apple Inc. people